José María Calvo (born 15 July 1981 in Quenumá, Buenos Aires), also known as Pampa Calvo, is an Argentine former professional footballer.  He has played for Boca Juniors and had loan spells in Spain for Gimnàstic and Recreativo.

Achievements

Club
Boca Juniors
 Primera División: 2000 Apertura, 2003 Apertura, 2005 Apertura, 2006 Clausura, 2008 Apertura
 Copa Libertadores: 2001, 2003
 Copa Intercontinental: 2003
 Copa Sudamericana: 2004, 2005
 Recopa Sudamericana: 2005, 2006

External links
 
 Argentine Primera statistics  
 
 Calvo, José María Historia de Boca.com 

1981 births
Living people
Sportspeople from Buenos Aires Province
Argentine people of Italian descent
Association football fullbacks
Argentine footballers
Boca Juniors footballers
La Liga players
Recreativo de Huelva players
Gimnàstic de Tarragona footballers
Argentine Primera División players
Argentine expatriate footballers
Expatriate footballers in Spain